Michael D. Bess (born 1955) is Chancellor's Professor of History, as well as Professor of the Communication of Science and Technology, and Professor of European Studies, at Vanderbilt University, where he has been teaching since 1989. He is a specialist in twentieth- and twenty-first century Europe, with a particular interest in the interactions between social and cultural processes and technological change.

He earned his PhD in history from the University of California, Berkeley in 1989.

His fifth and most recent book is Planet in Peril: Humanity’s Four Greatest Challenges and How We Can Overcome Them (Cambridge University Press, October 2022).  This study focuses on the existential risks posed by climate change, nuclear weapons, pandemics (natural or bioengineered), and artificial intelligence – surveying the solutions that have been tried, and why they have fallen short thus far.  Bess describes a pathway for gradually modifying the United Nations over the coming century so that it becomes more effective at coordinating global solutions.  The book explores how to get past ideological polarization and global political fragmentation, drawing lessons from the experience of the environmental movement and of the European unification movement.

He is also the author of four other books: 

• Our Grandchildren Redesigned: Life in the Bioengineered Society of the Near Future (Beacon Press, 2015); 

• Choices Under Fire: Moral Dimensions of World War II (Knopf, 2006); 

• The Light-Green Society: Ecology and Technological Modernity in France, 1960-2000 (U. of Chicago Press, 2003; French Translation, 2011, Champ Vallon), which won the George Perkins Marsh prize (2004) of the American Society for Environmental History; and

• Realism, Utopia, and the Mushroom Cloud: Four Activist Intellectuals and Their Strategies for Peace, 1945–1989. Louise Weiss (France), Leo Szilard (United States), E.P. Thompson (England), Danilo Dolci (Italy) (U. of Chicago Press, 1993).

He is currently at work on three book projects:

• Overflowing Goodness: How to Improve the Lives of Two Billion People (without harming anyone else) – a study of world poverty and how it could be dramatically reduced via a Guaranteed Minimum Income system implemented at a global scale.

• Strong Seeds: Human Flourishing and the Power of Seemingly Small Acts – an exploration of what makes for a life well lived, at four levels of experience and action: personal, national, global, and spiritual. 

• What Makes Us Human?  From Neurons to the Sistine Chapel – a synthesis of contemporary research on human nature and personhood, probing the boundaries between animals, humans, and advanced informatic machines.

Awards, Fellowships, and Teaching
Bess has received fellowships or grants from the John Simon Guggenheim Memorial Foundation, the American Council of Learned Societies, the National Institutes of Health / National Human Genome Research Institute, the John D. and Catherine T. MacArthur Foundation, the Fulbright research grants program, the Woodrow Wilson National Fellowship Foundation, and the University of California’s Institute on Global Conflict and Cooperation.

Bess has been teaching at Vanderbilt since 1989. He offers undergraduate courses on the history of environmentalism; human flourishing; the societal and moral implications of human bioenhancement; World War II; science and technology studies; the nature of human agency in history; as well as general survey courses on Europe Since 1900, and Western Civilization Since 1700. His graduate courses include seminars on World War II, Leonardo da Vinci, and a semester-long workshop to train graduate students for teaching history at the college level.

Bess has won the Jeffrey Nordhaus Award for Excellence in Undergraduate Teaching, the Ellen Gregg Ingalls Award for Excellence in Classroom Teaching, and the Vanderbilt Chair of Teaching Excellence.

Works
Realism, Utopia, and the Mushroom Cloud: Four Activist Intellectuals and their Strategies for Peace, 1945-1989 (U. of Chicago Press, 1993)
The Light-Green Society: Ecology and Technological Modernity in France, 1960-2000 (U. of Chicago Press, 2003)
Choices Under Fire: Moral Dimensions of World War II (Knopf, 2006)
Our Grandchildren Redesigned (Beacon Press, 2015)
Posthumanism: the Future of Homo Sapiens. Schirmer, 2018. Edited by Bess and Diana Walsh Pasulka. .
 Planet in Peril: Humanity's Four Greatest Challenges and How We Can Overcome Them (Cambridge U. Press, Oct. 2022)

References

External links
 Faculty page at the Vanderbilt University Department of History
 Personal website of Michael Bess

Living people
Vanderbilt University faculty
Historians of Europe
Year of birth uncertain
1955 births